Glomus is a genus of arbuscular mycorrhizal (AM) fungi, and all species form symbiotic relationships (mycorrhizae) with plant roots. Glomus is the largest genus of AM fungi, with ca. 85 species described, but is currently defined as non-monophyletic.

Classification
Glomus is one of the genera in the family Glomeraceae, in the division Glomeromycota. Some members of the genus were originally described as Sclerocystis species, but this genus has been entirely transferred to Glomus. However, further taxonomic changes are likely as the phylogeny of AM fungi becomes better understood.

Glomus is likely related to the fossil fungus Glomites, discovered in the Rhynie chert deposits from the Early Devonian (400 million years ago).

Ecology 
As with other AM fungi, all Glomus species are thought to be obligate symbionts, dependent on their mycorrhizal association with plant roots to complete their life cycle. They cannot be cultured in the laboratory in the absence of a plant host. Glomus species are found in nearly all terrestrial habitats, including arable land, deserts, grasslands, tropical forests, and tundras.

Arbuscular mycorrhizal fungi can provide numerous benefits to their plant hosts, including improved nutrient uptake, drought resistance, and disease resistance. However, the symbiosis is not mutualistic in all circumstances and may often be parasitic, with a detrimental effect on plant growth. Rarely, some plant species can parasitise the fungi.
Spores of Glomus prior to germinating produce an electric current.

Life cycle
Glomus species were considered to be entirely asexual until recently (see Meiosis section below).  Spores are produced at the tips of hyphae either within the host root or outside the root in the soil. Thought to be chlamydospores, these spores germinate and the germination tube that is produced grows through the soil until it comes into contact with roots. The fungus then penetrates the root and grows between root cells, or it may penetrate the cell wall and grow within root cells. Inside the root, the fungus forms arbuscules, which are highly branched hyphal structures that serve as sites of nutrient exchange with the plant. Arbuscules are formed within plant cell walls but are surrounded by an invaginated cell membrane, so remain within the apoplast. The fungus may also form vesicles, swollen structures which are thought to function as food storage organs.

Meiosis
Halary et al. searched the genomes of four Glomus species for the presence of genes that encode proteins essential for meiosis.  These proteins make up the conserved meiotic recombination machinery of eukaryotic cells.  The study indicated that the Glomus species contain 51 genes encoding all the tools necessary for meiotic recombination and associated DNA repair processes.  In particular, these species have seven genes that encode proteins whose only known function is in meiosis, including Dmc1 that is a meiosis-specific recombinase.  Since meiosis is considered to be a hallmark of sexual reproduction, it might be expected that a sexual stage or a sexual apparatus should be present.  However, as yet, none has been identified.  In addition, mating type gene homologues and a putative sex hormone-sensing pathway were detected in these fungi.  Based on these findings it was suggested that Glomus species may be able to undergo a cryptic sexual cycle.

The population structure of Glomus etunicatum suggests that clonal expansion plays an important role in the ecological success of Glomus species, and that gene exchanges are not completely absent, although likely very rare.

Agricultural significance 
Several species of Glomus, including G. aggregatum, are cultured and sold as mycorrhizal inoculant for agricultural soils. One species, G. macrocarpum (and possibly also G. microcarpum), causes tobacco stunt disease.

Species 
 Glomus aggregatum
 Glomus albidum
 Glomus ambisporum
 Glomus brazillanum
 Glomus caledonium
 Glomus coremioides
 Glomus claroideum
 Glomus clarum
 Glomus clavisporum
 Glomus constrictum
 Glomus coronatum
 Glomus deserticola
 Glomus diaphanum
 Glomus eburneum
 Glomus etunicatum
 Glomus fasciculatum
 Glomus fistulosum
 Glomus fragilistratum
 Glomus geosporum
 Glomus globiferum
 Glomus heterosporum
 Glomus hoi
 Glomus intraradices
 Glomus lacteum
 Glomus lamellosum
 Glomus luteum
 Glomus manihotis
 Glomus microaggregatum
 Glomus monosporum
 Glomus mosseae
 Glomus multicaule
 Glomus pansihalos
 Glomus pustulatum
 Glomus sinuosum
 Glomus spurcum
 Glomus tortuosum
 Glomus trimurales
 Glomus verruculosum
 Glomus versiforme
 Glomus viscosum

See also 
 Glomalin
 Glomeromycota

References 

 "Genus Glomus" at the Catalogue of Life Checklist
 International Culture Collection of (Vesicular) Arbuscular Mycorrhizal Fungi
 Symbiotic Fungi

Glomerales
Fungus genera
Taxa named by Edmond Tulasne